Dick Stewart may refer to:

 Dick Stewart (Australian footballer) (1873–1933), Australian rules footballer
 Dick Stewart (rugby union) (1871–1931), New Zealand rugby union player
 Dick Stewart (TV host) (born 1928), American singer, bandleader, actor and television host